The Mississippi Institute of Arts and Letters (MIAL) is a privately funded foundation created to recognize annually the greatest accomplishments in art, music, literature, and photography among Mississippians. The idea was conceived by, among others, former Mississippi Governor William Winter, Dr. Cora Norman, Dr. Aubrey Lucas, and Dr. Noel Polk in 1978, and the first awards were given out in 1980. Nominations for these awards may be made only by registered members of the Institute. The winners are chosen by a jury of prominent academics in each of the seven fields:  Fiction, Non-fiction, Visual Art, Concert Musical Composition, Popular Musical Composition, Photography, and Poetry.  The ceremony is held in a different Mississippi city each year.   Past winners have included Walker Percy, Ellen Douglas, Ellen Gilchrist, Richard Ford, Larry Brown, Rick Bass, Lewis Nordan, Beverly Lowry, Donna Tartt, Clifton Taulbert, Barry Hannah, Willie Morris, Leontyne Price, Cynthia Shearer, Stephen Ambrose, Steve Yarbrough, Tom Franklin, Brad Watson, Shelby Foote, Natasha Trethewey, Birney Imes, Maude Schyler Clay, William Grant Still, Morgan Freeman, Christopher Maurer, Wyatt Waters, Logan Skelton, and many others.  Lifetime achievement awards have been presented to artists such as Gulf Coast painter and potter Walter Anderson, Jackson writer Eudora Welty, and the distinguished film actor from the Delta, Morgan Freeman.

References

Arts organizations based in Mississippi
Arts organizations established in 1978
1978 establishments in Mississippi